Sabri Darbar Faisalabad is a Darbar Sahib or Sufi shrine in Faisalabad, Pakistan.

History 
Alauddin Ali Ahmed, also known as صابر کلیری Sabir Kaliyari ("Patient Saint of Kaliyar"), was a prominent South Asian Sufi saint in the 13th century, nephew and Khalifa (successor) to Baba Fareed (1188–1280), and the first in the Sabiriya branch of the Chishti Order. Today, his dargah (Sufi mausoleum) is at Kaliyar village, near Haridwar, India.

Syed Alauddin Ali Ahmed Sabir Kaliyari was born in Herat, a town in the district of ( Afghanisthan) on the 17th Shahbanon 19, 512 Hijri (1196). His father was Syed Abdul Rahim, a descendant of Gaus E Azam Dastagir. His mother was Jamila Khatun, the elder sister of Baba Fareed. He is known as Alauddin Ali Ahmed Sabir Kalyari. The names Ali and Ahmed were revealed to his mother in dreams. His father gave him the name Alauddin. Sabir was the title given by Baba Fareed Ganj E Sakar. Since his tomb is in Kalyar Sharif he is also known as Kalahari.

Location 
The shrine is located at Street number 4 at Manzoor Park, Nishatabad, Faisalabad

References

Sufi shrines in Pakistan
Chishti-Sabiris